Riana (pronounced rye-anna) is a small town in the North West region of Tasmania, south-west of the Dial Range. It is located west of the popular tourist town, Penguin. Riana and its smaller neighbouring town South Riana are a part of the municipality of the Central Coast Council

The fertile red soil hosts paddocks of vegetables (particularly potatoes) and dairy farms.

History
Riana Post Office opened on 1 August 1899. Riana South Post Office opened on 20 January 1908.
The current school, Riana Primary School, has been in its current location since the 1960s. Multiple schools existed in the vicinity of Riana after World War Two; however, they were closed due to a lack of teachers.

References

Localities of Central Coast Council (Tasmania)
Towns in Tasmania